General Glover may refer to:

James Glover (British Army officer) (1929–2000), British Army general
John Glover (general) (1732–1797), Continental Army brigadier general
Peter Glover (British Army officer) (1913–2009), British Army major general